Nassir El Aissati (born 12 August 1994) is a Dutch footballer who plays as a midfielder for FC Breukelen in the sixth tier Eerste Klasse.

He formerly played for FC Utrecht, Mjällby AIF and FK Karlskrona. He formerly played for Utrecht and Oss.

References

External links
 

Dutch footballers
FC Utrecht players
TOP Oss players
Eerste Divisie players
Sportspeople from Hilversum
1994 births
Living people
Association football midfielders
Mjällby AIF players
FK Karlskrona players
Dutch expatriate footballers
Expatriate footballers in Sweden
Dutch expatriate sportspeople in Sweden
Ettan Fotboll players
Footballers from North Holland